The Carry Back Stakes is an American Thoroughbred horse race once run annually at Calder Race Course in Miami Gardens, Florida but now run at Gulfstream Park after negotiations between the two tracks.

Contested during the first part of July, the race is open to three-year-old horses willing to race seven furlongs on the dirt.  A Listed event, it currently offers a purse of $150,000.

This race is named in honor of the Florida-bred 1961 American Champion Three-Year-Old Male Horse, Carry Back whose wins included the 1961 Flamingo Stakes and Florida Derby, as well as that year's Kentucky Derby and Preakness Stakes. Carry Back was inducted in the United States Racing Hall of Fame in 1975.

Inaugurated in 1975 as a race for two-year-old horses, in 1979 it was changed to a race for horses aged three and older. Since 1980 it has been restricted to three-year-olds and from 1981 to 1993 was run as the Carry Back Handicap. Since inception it has been contested at a variety of distances:
  furlongs : 1975–1978
 6 furlongs : 1980–1982, 1997 to 2013
  furlongs : 1991
 7 furlongs : 1979, 1992–1996, 2015 to present

Records
Speed  record: 
 at 6 furlongs – 1:09.30 – Lost in the Fog (2005)
 at 7 furlongs – 1:22.09 – Rated R. Superstar (2016)

Most wins by a jockey:
 3 – Eibar Coa (1997, 1998, 1999)

Most wins by a trainer:
 3 – Frank Gomez (1979, 1985, 1988)
 3 – Manuel Azpurua (1983, 1996, 2004)

Most wins by an owner:
 2 – Harry T. Mangurian Jr. (1981, 1982)

Winners of the Carry Back Stakes since 1975

References

 The Carry Back Stakes at Pedigree Query

Graded stakes races in the United States
Horse races in Florida
Flat horse races for three-year-olds
Recurring sporting events established in 1975
Gulfstream Park
1975 establishments in Florida